Italy sent a delegation to compete at the 1980 Summer Paralympics in Arnhem, Netherlands. Its athletes finished twentieth in the overall medal count.

Medalists

See also 
 1980 Summer Paralympics
 Italy at the 1980 Summer Olympics

References 

Nations at the 1980 Summer Paralympics
1980
Summer Paralympics